Hedworth Hylton Jolliffe, 2nd Baron Hylton DL (23 June 1829 – 31 October 1899), was a British peer and Conservative Member of Parliament.

Birth and education

Hylton was the second son of William George Hylton Jolliffe, 1st Baron Hylton, and Eleanor Paget. He was educated at Eton and Oriel College, Oxford.

Crimean War service

In 1849, he joined the 4th Light Dragoons and served in the Crimean War, where his older brother was killed at Sebastopol. He was present at the Charge of the Light Brigade. He retired from the Army in 1856, following his election to Parliament.

Parliamentary service
He was elected to the House of Commons for Wells in 1855, a seat he held until 1868.

In 1870 he succeeded his father as second Baron Hylton and entered the House of Lords.

Marriages
Lord Hylton married his second cousin, Lady Agnes Mary Byng, daughter of George Byng, 2nd Earl of Strafford, in 1858. Their divorce was a Cause célèbre. There were children of this marriage, sons and a daughter, Agatha Eleanor Augusta Jolliffe, who married Ailwyn Fellowes MP.

Lord Hylton married again to Anne, daughter of Henry Lambert, who was the second wife and the widow of the third Earl of Dunraven.

Death and succession
He died in October 1899, aged 70, and was succeeded in his titles by his surviving son Hylton George Hylton Jolliffe.

Notes

References 
Kidd, Charles, Williamson, David (editors). Debrett's Peerage and Baronetage (1990 edition). New York: St Martin's Press, 1990.

Further reading
Obituary in the New York Times, 1 November 1899, Wednesday: "LORD HYLTON DEAD.; He Took Part in the Charge of the Light Brigade at Balaklava.".

External links 
 

1829 births
1899 deaths
Barons in the Peerage of the United Kingdom
Conservative Party (UK) MPs for English constituencies
Deputy Lieutenants of Somerset
UK MPs 1852–1857
UK MPs 1857–1859
UK MPs 1859–1865
UK MPs 1865–1868
Hylton, B2
4th Queen's Own Hussars officers
British Army personnel of the Crimean War
People educated at Eton College
Alumni of Oriel College, Oxford
Hedworth
Younger sons of barons